Polysaccharide-K (Krestin, PSK) is a protein-bound polysaccharide isolated from the mycelium of Trametes versicolor.

Research
PSK has been studied in people with gastric cancer, breast cancer, colorectal cancer, and lung cancer. The US Food and Drug Administration has not approved PSK for cancer treatment or other medical uses. PSK has been the subject of investigation as an experimental adjunctive therapy for various types of cancers in Japan; however, sufficient data to demonstrate its efficacy for such purposes is lacking.

Preliminary studies examining PSK include its use in conjunction with chemotherapy for colorectal cancer, non-small cell lung carcinoma, breast cancer, liver cancer, and leukemia.

Chemistry
PSK is a protein polysaccharide consisting of a beta-glucan β-1,4 main chain with β-1,3 and β-1,6 side chains. The approximate molecular weight of PSK is 100,000 Da, and the protein component is reported at the β-1,6 side chain. PSK is isolated from the "CM-101" strain of Trametes versicolor. The analogous compound PSP, is derived from the "COV-1" strain of Trametes versicolor.

See also

Medicinal mushrooms
Polysaccharide peptide

References

External links
American Cancer Society's page for Trametes versicolor and Polysaccharide-K.
Memorial Sloan-Kettering Cancer Center's page for Trametes versicolor and Polysaccharide-K.
A "Detailed Scientific Review of Trametes versicolor and Polysaccharide-K" by the MD Anderson Cancer Center.
Trametes versicolor and Polysaccharide-K information from Drugs.com.

Medicinal fungi